Single-minded Dandelion is a 2014 South Korean morning soap opera starring Kim Ga-eun, Hong In-young, Yoon Sun-woo and Jeon Seung-bin. It aired on KBS2 from August 25, 2014 to February 27, 2015 on Mondays to Fridays at 09:00 for 134 episodes.

Plot
During the 1960s and 1970s, two sisters work at a flour mill and experience life and love.

Cast
Kim Ga-eun as Min Deul-re
Ahn Seo-hyun as young Deul-re
Hong In-young as Shin Se-young/Jin Se-young
Lee Young-eun as young Se-young
Yoon Sun-woo as Shin Tae-oh
Yoo Seung-yong as young Tae-oh
Jeon Seung-bin as Cha Yong-soo/Sam Cha
Shin Ki-joon as young Yong-soo
Kim Ha-kyun as Park Soon-hee
Joo Min-ha as Park Choon-ok
Jung Ji-in as young Choon-ok
Choi Cheol-ho as Min Kang-wook
Shin Eun-jung as Choi Joo-hee
Lee Jin-woo as Jin Sun-jae
Noh Young-hak as Kang Dong-soo/Jin Do-young
Kim Jin-seo as Heo Bong-jae
Choi Jae-sung as Shin Dae-sung
Choi Ji-na as Yoon Jung-im
Kim Jin-yi as Choi Jung-won	
Lee Eun-hyung as Seo Joon-ho
Tang Jun-sang as young Joon-ho
Kim Ye-ryeong as Hwang Geum-shil
Yeon Je-wook as Song Soo-chul
Kim Tae-yong as young Soo-chul
Lee Ah-yi as Song Soo-ja
Jung Chan-bi as young Soo-ja
Choi Wan-jung as Joo Kyung-ae
Do Min-hyuk
Jo Hyun-do as Ddaem Tong
Lee Chae-yoon
Jang Dae-woong as Ko Jjil-jjil
Choi Su-rin as Madam Jang
Park Jae-woong as Do Bong-san
Jang Tae-sung as Jang Young-man
Lee Myung-ho as Lee Gyo-seok

Awards and nominations

References

External links
  
 

Korean Broadcasting System television dramas
2014 South Korean television series debuts
2015 South Korean television series endings
Korean-language television shows
South Korean romance television series